Lox is a fillet of cured salmon.

LOX is liquid oxygen.

Lox or LOX may also refer to:

Places
 Lox Yeo River in Somerset, England, formerly simply known as the Lox
 River Lox in Sussex, England, a tributary of the River Arun

Art, entertainment, and media
 The LOX, a rap group
 WLOX, a television station based in Biloxi, Mississippi

Science
 Cre-Lox recombination a site-specific recombinase technology widely used to carry out deletions, insertions, translocations and inversions in the DNA of cells
 Lipoxygenase, a family of iron-containing enzymes that catalyse the dioxygenation of polyunsaturated fatty acids
 Liquid oxygen, also abbreviated LOx
 LOX (gene), which encodes the enzyme Lysyl oxidase in humans

See also
 Locks (disambiguation)